Four Element Composition is a gouache on paper by Mainie Jellett from 1930.

Description
The gouache measures 28 × 21.5 centimeters. 
It is in the collection of the Irish Museum of Modern Art in Dublin.

Analysis
Four Elements suggests an influence from the four Evangelists from the Book of Kells.
Jellett combined Celtic illuminated manuscripts and Cubism.

References 

1930 paintings